Durai (born 25 February 1940) is an Indian film director who was mostly active during the 1970s. As of 2014, he has directed 46 films in Tamil, Telugu, Kannada, Malayalam and Hindi. Though known for his work in commercial cinema, he made women-centric films  like Avalum Penthaane and Pasi, which won two National Film Awards. He served as a jury member of the 58th National Film Awards (India) in 2011. As of 2011, he was the vice president of the South Indian Film Writers' Association.

Partial filmography

 Avalum Penn Thaane (1974)
 Oru Kudumbathin Kathai (1975)
 Aasai 60 Naal (1976)
 Raghupathi Raghavan Rajaram (1977)
 Paavathin Sambalam (1978)
 Oru Veedu Oru Ulagam (1978)
 Sadhurangam (1978)
 Aayiram Jenmangal (1978)
 Pasi (1979)
 Oli Pirandhadhu (1979)
 Neeya? (1979)
Porkaalam (1980)
 Maria My Darling (1980)
Aval Oru Kaviyam (1981)
Mayil (1981)
Thani Maram (1981)
Kilinjalgal (1981)
Thunai (1982)
Velicham Vitharunna Penkutty (1982)
Do Gulaab (1983)
 Pet Pyaar Aur Paap (1984)
Veli (1985)
Oru Manithan Oru Manaivi (1986)
Palaivanathil Pattampoochi (1988)
 Pudhiya Athiyayam (1990)

Awards

 1978 – Tamil Nadu State Film Award for Best Director – Oru Veedu Oru Ulagam
 1979 – National Film Award for Best Feature Film in Tamil – Pasi
 1979 - Filmfare Award for Best Film - Tamil - Pasi 
 1980 – Best Film Award for Pasi at Tashkent Film Festival
 1982 – Kalaimamani

References

External links
 Official website
 

1940 births
Tamil film directors
Telugu film directors
Tamil Nadu State Film Awards winners
People from Thanjavur district
Tamil film editors
Living people
Kannada film directors
20th-century Indian film directors
Film directors from Tamil Nadu
Film editors from Tamil Nadu
National Film Award (India) winners